Ram Jeevan Singh  is an Indian politician. He was elected to the Lok Sabha, the lower house of the Parliament of India from the Balia in Bihar as a member of the Janata Dal (United).

References

External links
Official biographical sketch in Parliament of India website

Janata Dal (United) politicians
India MPs 1977–1979
India MPs 1999–2004
Janata Dal politicians
Janata Party politicians
Lok Sabha members from Bihar
1932 births
Living people
Bihar MLAs 1967–1969
Bihar MLAs 1969–1972
Bihar MLAs 1972–1977
Bihar MLAs 1990–1995
Bihar MLAs 1995–2000